Sling Blade is a 1996 American drama film written and directed by Billy Bob Thornton, who also stars in the lead role. Set in Arkansas, it is the story of intellectually challenged Karl Childers, and the friendship he develops with a boy and his mother. Karl was released from a psychiatric hospital, where he had grown up due to having killed his mother and her lover when he was 12 years old. It also stars Dwight Yoakam, J. T. Walsh, John Ritter, Lucas Black, Natalie Canerday, James Hampton, and Robert Duvall.

The film was adapted by Thornton from his previous one-man show Swine Before Pearls, from which he also developed a screenplay for the 1994 short film Some Folks Call It a Sling Blade, directed by George Hickenlooper. Sling Blade became a sleeper hit, launching Thornton into stardom. It won the Academy Award for Best Writing, Adapted Screenplay, and Thornton was nominated for Best Actor in a Leading Role. The music for the soundtrack was provided by French Canadian artist/producer Daniel Lanois.

Sling Blade was filmed in 24 days, on location in Benton, Arkansas, produced by David L. Bushell and Brandon Rosser.

Plot
Karl Childers is a developmentally disabled Arkansas man whose parents physically and mentally abused him when he was young. He has been in the custody of the state mental hospital since the age of 12 after murdering his mother and her teenage lover, who was also his tormentor, with a sling blade. Karl believed his mother was being raped and killed the teen in defense of her. When he realized his mother was a willing participant in the affair, Karl killed her as well.

Karl spends his days just staring out the window and rubbing his hands together. As a passive person, he is often forced by serial rapist Charles to listen to stories of his criminal history as a convicted sexual predator. The state determines that Karl is no longer dangerous and releases him. Karl wants to stay and pleads to, but is told that he has to leave. He goes back to his hometown, where he finds work as a small engine mechanic.

Karl befriends 12-year-old Frank Wheatley and shares details of his past, including the killings. Frank introduces Karl to his mother, Linda, and her friend and boss, Vaughan. Vaughan is concerned about Karl's history, but Linda asks him to move into her garage, angering her abusive and alcoholic boyfriend, Doyle. Vaughan tells Karl that he fears Doyle could hurt or kill Linda and Frank one day.

Karl becomes a role model to Frank, who misses his deceased father and despises Doyle. As they grow closer, Karl tells Frank that he is haunted by an incident that happened when he was six or eight years old. His parents performed an abortion of his unwanted baby brother and made him dispose of the body. Karl found the baby was still moving and buried him alive. Karl later visits his sickly father and tries to reconcile, but is rejected. He scolds his father for his past cruelty and says that he thought many times about killing him, but no longer sees the need.

During Doyle's latest drunken outburst, where he refuses to leave Linda's house, Frank fights back. Linda later reconciles with Doyle, who announces that he is moving in with them. He tells Karl that he is no longer welcome. When Frank protests, Doyle grabs him, but Karl intervenes and warns him never to touch Frank again.

Realizing that an unhappy childhood or worse awaits Frank, Karl persuades him and Linda to spend the night at Vaughan's house. Later that evening, he returns to the Wheatley home carrying a lawn mower blade, and finds Doyle drunk and alone in the living room. Karl kills Doyle, calls 9-1-1, and then eats biscuits with mustard, a childhood favorite, while waiting for the police.

Karl is returned to the state hospital, but is now more assertive. Charles tells him more stories about his sex crimes and then questions him about his relationship with Frank. This angers Karl, who tells Charles to never speak to him again. As Charles walks away, Karl turns towards him and then resumes looking out of the window toward an open field.

Cast
 Billy Bob Thornton as Karl Childers
 Dwight Yoakam as Doyle Hargraves
 J. T. Walsh as Charles Bushman
 John Ritter as Vaughan Cunningham
 Lucas Black as Frank Wheatley
 Natalie Canerday as Linda Wheatley
 James Hampton as Jerry Woolridge
 Robert Duvall as Frank Childers
 Jim Jarmusch as Deke, the Frostee Cream employee 
 Rick Dial as Bill Cox
 Vic Chesnutt as Terence
 Brent Briscoe as Scooter Hodges
 Mickey Jones as Johnson
 Col. Bruce Hampton as Morris

Production
Thornton conceived the character of Karl while working on the film The Man Who Broke 1,000 Chains. He developed the idea into a monologue, which became a one man show to fund the film. He expanded the monologue into a short film, Some Folks Call it a Sling Blade, directed by George Hickenlooper and starring Thornton, Molly Ringwald, and J.T. Walsh.

The film was made with a production budget of $1 million financed by The Shooting Gallery, and was sold to Miramax for $10 million, which at the time was a record price for an independent film.

Release
The film grossed $24,444,121 in the United States against a $1 million production budget. It grossed a further $9.7 million in other territories for a worldwide total of $34 million.

Reception
On Rotten Tomatoes the film has a "Certified Fresh" rating of 97% based on reviews from 58 critics with an average rating of 8.40/10. The site's consensus states "You will see what's coming, but the masterful performances, especially Thornton's, will leave you riveted." On Metacritic it has a score of 84% based on reviews from 26 critics.

The Washington Post called it a "masterpiece of Southern storytelling". Kevin Thomas wrote in the Los Angeles Times that the film is "a mesmerizing parable of good and evil and a splendid example of Southern storytelling at its most poetic and imaginative". The New York Times critic Janet Maslin praised the performances but said that "it drifts gradually toward climactic events that seem convenient and contrived".

Accolades

References

External links

 
 
 

1996 drama films
1996 films
American drama films
American films based on plays
American independent films
Edgar Award-winning works
Features based on short films
Films about child abuse
Films about domestic violence
Films directed by Billy Bob Thornton
Films set in Arkansas
Films shot in Arkansas
Films whose writer won the Best Adapted Screenplay Academy Award
Southern Gothic films
1996 directorial debut films
1996 independent films
Miramax films
Films about mother–son relationships
1990s English-language films
1990s American films